Frognerbadet ("the Frogner Baths") is a pool complex in the borough of Frogner in Oslo, Norway. It was designed by architect Frode Rinnan.

Located adjacent to Frognerparken, it opened in 1956, and doubles as a public bath and swimming pool and a professional swimming venue. The festival Norwegian Wood used to be hosted within its premises.

It has two 50-meter pools, one with 8 lanes for competitive swimming, and a diving pool with springboards and platforms at heights of 1, 3, 5, 7 and 10 meters.

References

Sports venues in Oslo
Public baths in Scandinavia
Swimming venues in Norway
1956 establishments in Norway
Sports venues completed in 1956
Diving venues
Frogner Park